François Leguat Giant Tortoise and Cave Reserve ("Francois Leguat Reserve") is a park and nature reserve on the island of Rodrigues, dedicated to protecting the fauna and flora of the island. The reserve first opened in August 2007, part of the same project as La Vanille Reserve in Mauritius. It is named after the 18th century Huguenot settler François Leguat, who recorded much of the island's natural flora and fauna before it went extinct. The reserve includes a museum, several education centres and information areas, and a restaurant.

Description

The fauna
 

Rodrigues was once home to two unique and endemic species of giant tortoise: the tall-standing, long-necked, saddle-backed Cylindraspis vosmaeri that browsed the trees and bushes; and the smaller, low, dome-shelled Cylindraspis peltastes that grazed grasses and ground vegetation. At the time of the arrival of human settlers, dense tortoise herds of many thousands were reported on Rodrigues.  Typically for isolated island species, they were reported to have been friendly and unafraid of humans.

By early accounts, the tall Cylindraspis vosmaeri in particular was a social animal that lived and interacted in herds, and showed no fear of humans. In the ensuing years, sailors and settlers slaughtered the tortoises in enormous numbers. Occasional individual tortoises are recorded as being found surviving in isolated valleys of the island until as late as 1802. They do not seem to have survived the ensuing period though, when settlers used vast fires to clear the entire island of vegetation, to access it for agriculture.

The tortoises however, played a crucial role in the health of the island's indigenous vegetation and ecosystems. Their movements and grazing rejuvenated the vegetation and the seeds of many plants needed the tortoises for dispersal and germination. 
For this reason, nearly two hundred years after the extinction of their endemic predecessors, the reserve introduced 500 Aldabra giant tortoises (Aldabrachelys gigantea) and 40 Radiated tortoises (Astrochelys radiata). This is in order to play the role of the original species, in ensuring the health of the natural vegetation. Currently the population of these introduced tortoises has risen to 2000.

Other animals include the Rodrigues Fruit Bat (Pteropus rodricensis), the rarest bat in the world and one of only three endemic animals to survive in Rodrigues (the other two are birds). In 1970, only 70 of these bats remained, but extreme conservation efforts have now helped the species recover.

The flora

The reserve conserves a portion of Rodrigues island's almost extinct coastal flora. Along with Anse Quitor Nature Reserve next door, it is the only remaining patch of this ecosystem.

The vegetation is being restored and over 100,000 plants from 33 indigenous and endemic species have been planted. The giant tortoises perform an important role - once played by Rodrigues extinct giant tortoise species - of rejuvenating and maintaining the ecosystem, through their grazing and movements.

The caves
The cave system in the reserve includes the Grande-Caverne (500 meters long) and the Caverne-de-la-Vierge (255 meters), along with others that are closed or not yet rehabilitated. The reserve's tours include a trip through the caves, which are the only caves in the Indian Ocean equipped with lights.

Location

Francois Leguat Reserve is located on the Anse Quitor peninsula in the south-west of the island, a few hundred meters from the Rodrigues airport and right beside Anse Quitor Nature Reserve (not yet open to the public).

References

External links
 Francois Leguat Reserve website

Nature reserves of Rodrigues